5-MeO-aMT or 5-methoxy-α-methyltryptamine, α,O-Dimethylserotonin (Alpha-O) is a potent psychedelic tryptamine. It is soluble in ethanol.

Pharmacology
The sympathomimetic effects may in turn be caused by 5-MeO-AMT's structural similarity to the amphetamines. As noted by Alexander Shulgin, the alpha-methylated tryptamines can be looked at as the tryptamine homologues of the amphetamines (alpha-methylated phenethylamines).

Mechanisms of action such as inhibition of monoamine reuptake may be involved also.

Pharmacokinetics

Recreational usage

5-MeO-AMT is supposedly sold in 4 mg tablets by the street name Alpha-O and taken as a recreational drug. Since the DEA arrests of the makers of a huge percentage of the United States' LSD in 2000, 5-MeO-AMT may have occasionally been sold under the guise of LSD in liquid, sugar cube, or blotter form, though this may be due to DEA reports of finding it on sugar cubes and blotters like LSD.

The most common route of administration for 5-MeO-AMT is orally. Anecdotal reports, however, have described snorting or smoking the substance. Intravenous (IV) and intramuscular (IM) routes are rarely, if ever, used outside research settings due to the high potency, powerful effects and quicker onset.

Effects 

The effects of 5-MeO-AMT occur at 4–7 mg orally for most users.

Erowid lists the following effects:

Positive
 Increased energy
 Improved mood heading into euphoria at higher doses
 Increased sociability, gregariousness
 Increased giggling and laughter
 Increased sense of creative thinking
 Increased pleasure from sense of touch
 Intensification of sex for some users

Neutral
 Lightheadedness
 Brightening of colors
 Visuals including motion, waves, breathing walls, etc. (usually at higher doses, over 4–5 mg)
 Increased attention to detail
 Auditory distortions and/or hallucinations (usually at higher doses)

Negative

 Headache
 Body fatigue
 Chills from elevated body temperature (potential dehydration)
 Stress and extreme fatigue from long duration of effects.
 Nausea, diarrhea
 Vomiting 
 Difficulty sleeping or resting for 12–24 hours after ingestion.
 Paranoia, irritability, anxiety (increasing with dose).
 Delusional, aggressive, or dissociated behaviour at very high doses (20+ mg)
 Risk of death

Dangers
If misrepresented as LSD, 5-MeO-AMT can be extremely dangerous; users may take a number of "hits" of 5-MeO-AMT, assuming that it is LSD. Unlike LSD, which is very safe in overdose, 5-MeO-AMT can be very harmful or fatal. Particularly sensitive individuals can experience symptoms of overdose at dosages in the normal (for most users) range — as low as 20 mg. This has led to at least a few hospitalizations and possibly more than one death. It is likely that the overdose potential of the compound is due to its sympathomimetic effects, as the side effects noted in overdose cases include cardiac arrhythmia and seizure. It also seems that oral consumption is safer than insufflation.

Gloria Discerni, 18, died after overdosing on a drug initially believed to be LSD. Authorities learned months later that the drug wasn't LSD but a "designer drug" identified as 5-MeO-AMT.

Legal Status

Australia
5-MeO-aMT is considered a Schedule 9 prohibited substance in Australia under the Poisons Standard (October 2015). A Schedule 9 substance is a substance which may be abused or misused, the manufacture, possession, sale or use of which should be prohibited by law except when required for medical or scientific research, or for analytical, teaching or training purposes with approval of Commonwealth and/or State or Territory Health Authorities.

Sweden
Sveriges riksdags health ministry Statens folkhälsoinstitut classified 5-MeO-αMT as "health hazard" under the act Lagen om förbud mot vissa hälsofarliga varor (translated Act on the Prohibition of Certain Goods Dangerous to Health) as of Oct 1, 2004,  in their regulation SFS 2004:696 listed as 5-metoxi-alfametyltryptamin (5-MeO-AMT), making it illegal to sell or possess.

United Kingdom
5-MeO-αMT was made illegal in the United Kingdom as of 7 January 2015, along with 5-MeO-DALT. This was following the events of 10 June 2014 when the Advisory Council on the Misuse of Drugs recommended that 5-MeO-αMT be scheduled as a class A drug by updating the blanket ban clause on tryptamines.

United States
5-MeO-AMT is not scheduled at the federal level in the United States.

Florida
5-MeO-AMT is a Schedule I controlled substance in the state of Florida, making it illegal to buy, sell, or possess.

See also 
 5-Chloro-αMT
 5-EtO-AMT
 5-MeO-AET
 5-MeO-DMT
 5-MeO-DPT
 5-MeO-DiPT
 AMT

References

External links 
 DEA forensic journal on 5-MeO-AMT
 Erowid 5-MeO-AMT vault
 Lycaeum 5-MeO-AMT page
 TiHKAL entry
 5-MeO-AMT (α,O-DMS) entry in TiHKAL • info

Psychedelic tryptamines
Monoamine oxidase inhibitors
Serotonin-norepinephrine-dopamine releasing agents
Serotonin receptor agonists
Mexamines
Designer drugs